George Powell (1794–1824) was an English sealer, explorer and amateur naturalist. He captained three sealing expeditions to the Antarctic Ocean between 1818 and 1822.

Powell was born in London. During his first expedition, in 1818 and 1819, he captained the sloop Dove and visited South Georgia and Kerguelen Islands.  His second expedition, captaining Eliza, lasted from 1819 until 1821, during which time he visited the Falkland Islands and the South Shetland Islands.

In 1821 and 1822 he took both Dove, which he captained, and Eliza, captained by John Wright, on another sealing expedition to the South Shetland Islands, for which he produced a very fine chart based on his own observations of the north coast of the group and the observations of others for the southern coast.  On 6 December 1821, he co-discovered the South Orkney Islands along with American Nathaniel Palmer, claiming them in the name of King George IV.

Both Powell Island and Powell Basin are named after him. He died in Tonga.

References 

1794 births
1824 deaths
Explorers of Antarctica
Sea captains
Sealers
South Orkney Islands
English explorers
19th-century explorers
19th-century English people